Kwasha Lipton was an employee benefits consulting firm located in Fort Lee, New Jersey.

History 
It was founded in 1944 by H. Charles "Chick" Kwasha and Maurice Lipton.

Kwasha Lipton is best known for creating a special type of defined benefit pension plan called a cash balance plan, which it designed for the employees of Bank of America in 1985.  Kwasha Lipton implemented dozens of cash balance plans for its other clients, and these plans were ultimately adopted by various companies throughout the United States. Some employees allege that the plans discriminate against older workers in violation of federal age discrimination law because of the way in which younger and older employees earn benefits under cash balance plans.  Many cases found plan sponsors liable most were later reversed by appellate courts. However to retroactively approve the plan Congress enacted the Pension Protection Act of 2006. This settled whether the cash balance plan created ab initio violated age discrimination, however plan conversions which created cash balance plans out of existing traditional pensions by freezing accruals of older workers is still an unsettled issue.

Kwasha Lipton was acquired in 1996 by Coopers & Lybrand and became the Kwasha Lipton Group of Coopers & Lybrand.  Coopers & Lybrand then merged with Price Waterhouse on July 1, 1998 to form PricewaterhouseCoopers.  The Kwasha Lipton Group was combined with PricewaterhouseCoopers' other benefit consulting groups to create Unifi, which shortly thereafter was sold to Mellon Financial. Mellon combined Unifi with its Buck Consultants subsidiary to create Mellon HR Solutions, which was sold to Affiliated Computer Services (ACS) for $405 million in 2005 and renamed Buck Consultants.

In 2010, ACS was sold to Xerox for $6.4 billion. Buck Consultants was later rebranded as "Buck Consultants at Xerox".

Kwasha Lipton owned and occupied a building in Fort Lee, New Jersey.  It is the first office building visible to the North after passing from New York City to New Jersey across the George Washington Bridge, and it has views of the bridge and the Manhattan skyline.  The 13-story building has  of office space, and was sold in July 2005 for $33.7 million.  ACS remains the primary occupant leasing the building.

References

External links 
 Buck Consultants

Management consulting firms of the United States
Financial services companies established in 1944
Defunct companies based in New Jersey
Actuarial firms
Companies based in Bergen County, New Jersey
1944 establishments in New Jersey
Financial services companies disestablished in 1996
1996 disestablishments in New Jersey